Asplin is a surname. Notable people with the surname include:

Per Asplin (1928–1996), Norwegian pianist, singer, composer, and actor
Richard Asplin (born 1972), English novelist
William Asplin (1686/7–1758), British writer

See also
 Esplin

English-language surnames